Percy Muzi Tau (born 13 May 1994) is a South African professional football player who plays for Egyptian Premier League club Al Ahly SC as a forward  and the South African national team.

Tau began his footballing career with Premier Soccer League side Mamelodi Sundowns where he made 100 appearances either side of a loan to Witbank Spurs. During his time with Sundowns, he won the league title twice and the CAF Champions League once and was named Footballer of the Year and joint-top-goalscorer in his final season with the club.

He joined Brighton in 2018 but, due to work-permit complications, was loaned out to Belgian side Union SG with whom he won the Proximus League Player of the Season award. His form earned him a short-term move to Club Brugge, where he won a league winners' medal the following season, before being loaned out for a third consecutive season when he signed for rivals Anderlecht in 2020.

Tau signed for Egyptian Premier League side Al Ahly SC in 2021 on a two-year contract.

Club career

Mamelodi Sundowns
Born in eMalahleni, Tau began his career with Mamelodi Sundowns in the Premier Soccer League. He made his professional debut for the club on 25 February 2014 in the league against Orlando Pirates. He came on as an 85th-minute substitute for Domingues as Sundowns lost 1–0. Tau then scored his first professional goal for the club during a Nedbank Cup match on 22 March 2014 against Golden Arrows. His 90th-minute goal was the fourth and final goal for Sundowns as they won 4–1 against the Arrows. He then scored his first goal in international club competition on 5 April 2015 in a CAF Champions League match against TP Mazembe. He scored the Sundown's one and only goal of the match in the 84th minute as Mamelodi Sundowns fell 3–1. After two seasons and rarely appearing for Mamelodi Sundowns, Tau was placed on the club's release list for the 2014–15 season.

On the advice of then-youth coach Rhulani Mokwena, he was loaned to National First Division side Witbank Spurs instead. He made his debut for the club on 6 February 2016 in a 3–1 win over African Warriors and went on to score 3 goals in 11 appearances during his loan spell.

After a season with Witbank Spurs, Tau rejoined Mamelodi Sundowns and was included in the squad for the club's CAF Champions League campaign. He featured throughout and played every minute of both legs of a 3–1 aggregate win over Egyptian side Zamalek in the CAF Champions League Final. The victory was Sundowns' first ever triumph in a continental competition. He then scored his first goal in the league for the club on 2 November 2016 against Polokwane City. He scored the first of two goals for the side as they went on to win 2–0. Tau then made his debut for the side in the FIFA Club World Cup on 11 December 2016 against Kashima Antlers. Sundowns were knocked-out of the competition after losing to the Japanese side 2–0. During the fifth place match, Tau scored the only goal for Sundowns as they fell 4–1 to Jeonbuk Hyundai Motors of South Korea.

During the 2017–18 season, Tau scored 11 goals to help Mamelodi Sundowns to the league title. His form throughout the season saw him share the Lesley Manyathela Golden Boot with Rodney Ramagalela and earned him the Footballer of the Season and Players' Player of the Season awards. As a result of his achievements, Tau was courted by a number of European clubs during the off-season. Amidst the speculation surrounding his future, he refused to join Sundowns in the pre-season preparations in an attempt to force through a move.

Brighton & Hove Albion
On 20 July 2018, Tau signed a four-year contract with English Premier League club Brighton & Hove Albion, for an undisclosed transfer fee, reported to be in the region of R50 million (UK£2.7 million), a South African record sale of a domestic player. Brighton manager, Chris Hughton, confirmed that Tau would be loaned out shortly after his transfer, after failing a UK work permit, as well as him wanting the South African international to gain European football experience.
On 7 January 2021, he returned to Brighton & Hove Albion, after being recalled from his loan spell at Anderlecht.

Loan to Union SG
On 15 August, Tau joined Belgian second division side Union SG, owned by Brighton chairman Tony Bloom, on a season-long loan. He was immediately introduced into the first team and played a particularly important role in the Belgian Cup during the first half of the season, scoring four goals in six appearances to help the club reach the semi-finals after recording historic wins over both Anderlecht and Genk.

In April 2019, after scoring six goals and recording seven assist to help Union finish the season in second place, Tau was one of three players nominated for the Player of the Season award, alongside teammate Faïz Selemani. He ultimately won the award and was named in the league's team of the season.

Loan to Club Brugge

On 29 July 2019, Tau signed for Belgian side Club Brugge on loan for the 2019–20 season. He made his debut for the club on 2 August 2019 against Sint-Truiden where he scored in the club's 6–0 home victory. On 13 August, he was sent off with for a second bookable offence during a 3–3 away draw against Dynamo Kiev in what was only his second career Champions League game. Brugge went through 4–3 on aggregate. Tau appeared in the 2–2 away draw at Real Madrid on 1 October, where he assisted the first goal.

The league was ended in May with one remaining match to be played due to Covid–19. Tau played 18 league matches scoring three as Club Bruges won the title, finishing 15 points clear of 2nd place.

Loan to Anderlecht

On 4 August 2020, Tau signed for Belgian club Anderlecht, on a one-year loan. He made his debut for the club on 16 August 2020, coming on as a substitute in the 64th minute against Sint-Truiden, and scored his first goal as Anderlecht won the match 3-1.

Return to Brighton
On 7 January 2021, Tau was recalled by parent club Brighton, after just four months at Anderlecht, following the club receiving a Governing Body Endorsement, the new points-based system for non-English players which came into force when the transition period following the UK's exit from the European Union ended, from the FA for Tau. On 10 January 2021, 905 days after signing for The Seagulls Tau made his debut coming on as a substitute in an FA Cup third round tie away at Newport County in which Brighton eventually won on penalties. Three days later he made his league debut for Brighton starting in the 1–0 Premier League loss at Manchester City. On 15 May, while only making his third Premier League appearance Tau sent in a through ball to Danny Welbeck who chipped the ball over keeper Łukasz Fabiański putting The Seagulls ahead in an eventual 1–1 home draw against West Ham.

Al Ahly

Tau signed a permanent deal for decorated Egyptian Premier League Al Ahly on 26 August 2021. Tau played in the 2021 CAF Super Cup on 22 December, in which he assisted Al Ahly's goal in the eventual penalty shootout victory, in which he scored.

International career
Tau made his debut for South Africa on 17 October 2015 in a 0–2 loss to Angola in a 2016 African Nations Championship qualification match. On 25 March 2017, he scored his first international goal in the 69th minute against Guinea-Bissau after receiving a yellow card two minutes earlier.

On 13 October 2018, Tau was one of South Africa's goalscorers as the nation recorded its largest ever victory with a 6–0 win over Seychelles in an Africa Cup of Nations qualifier. On 24 March 2019, he scored twice in a 2–1 win over Libya to secure South Africa's qualification for the 2019 Africa Cup of Nations. His brace took him to four goals for the qualifying campaign, ranking him among the highest goalscorers in qualification.

Tau was named in the South African squad for the 2019 edition of the African Cup of Nations. He started in all five games for his country where they made the quarter final stage, losing to Nigeria to deny them a semi-final spot.

Career statistics

Club

International

International goals
Scores and results list South Africa's goal tally first.

Honours

Club
Mamelodi Sundowns
Premier Soccer League: 2013–14, 2017–18
Nedbank Cup: 2014–15
Telkom Knockout: 2015
CAF Champions League: 2016
CAF Super Cup: 2017

Club Brugge
Belgian Pro League: 2019–20
Al Ahly

 CAF Super Cup: 2021
 Egyptian Super Cup: 2021–22

International
South Africa
2018 Four Nations Tournament

Individual
Lesley Manyathela Golden Boot: 2017–18
PSL Footballer of the Year: 2017–18
PSL Players' Player of the Season: 2017–18
Belgian First Division B Player of the Season: 2018–19
Belgian First Division B Team of the Season: 2018–19

References

1994 births
Living people
South African soccer players
Belgian Pro League players
Mamelodi Sundowns F.C. players
Brighton & Hove Albion F.C. players
Royale Union Saint-Gilloise players
Club Brugge KV players
R.S.C. Anderlecht players
South African Premier Division players
South Africa international soccer players
2019 Africa Cup of Nations players
Expatriate footballers in Belgium
Association football midfielders